The Cincinnati Reds' 1982 season was a season in American baseball. It involved the Reds finishing in sixth place in the National League West Division, with a record of 61 wins and 101 losses, 28 games behind the Atlanta Braves. The Reds played their home games at Riverfront Stadium. John McNamara managed the club to a 34–58 start before being replaced in late July by Russ Nixon, who compiled a 27–43 record the rest of the year. 1982 was the first time that the Reds finished in last place since 1937, as well as their first losing season since 1971, the team's first full season at Riverfront. It was also the first 100-loss season in franchise history. They would not have another 100-loss season until 40 years later in 2022.

Offseason 
 November 4, 1981: Ken Griffey was traded by the Reds to the New York Yankees for a player to be named later and Brian Ryder (minors). The Yankees completed the deal by sending Freddie Toliver to the Reds on December 9.
 December 11, 1981: Scott Brown was traded by the Reds to the Kansas City Royals for Clint Hurdle.
 December 18, 1981: Ray Knight was traded by the Reds to the Houston Astros for César Cedeño.
 January 12, 1982: Randy Myers was drafted by the Reds in the 3rd round of the 1982 Major League Baseball Draft, but did not sign.
 February 9, 1982: Paul Moskau was traded by the Reds to the Baltimore Orioles for a player to be named later. The Orioles completed the deal by sending Wayne Krenchicki to the Reds on February 16.
 February 10, 1982: George Foster was traded by the Reds to the New York Mets for Alex Treviño, Jim Kern, and Greg A. Harris.

Regular season

Season standings

Record vs. opponents

Notable transactions 
 March 26, 1982: Joe Nolan was traded by the Reds to the Baltimore Orioles for Dallas Williams and Brooks Carey (minors).

Roster

Player stats

Batting

Starters by position 
Note: Pos = Position; G = Games played; AB = At bats; H = Hits; Avg. = Batting average; HR = Home runs; RBI = Runs batted in

Other batters 
Note: G = Games played; AB = At bats; H = Hits; Avg. = Batting average; HR = Home runs; RBI = Runs batted in

Pitching

Starting pitchers 
Note: G = Games pitched; IP = Innings pitched; W = Wins; L = Losses; ERA = Earned run average; SO = Strikeouts

Other pitchers 
Note: G = Games pitched; IP = Innings pitched; W = Wins; L = Losses; ERA = Earned run average; SO = Strikeouts

Relief pitchers 
Note: G = Games pitched; W = Wins; L = Losses; SV = Saves; ERA = Earned run average; SO = Strikeouts

Farm system 

LEAGUE CHAMPIONS: Indianapolis

Notes

References 
1982 Cincinnati Reds season at Baseball Reference

Cincinnati Reds seasons
Cincinnati Reds season
Cinc